Plenița is a commune in Dolj County, Oltenia, Romania with a population of 5,800 people. It is composed of two villages, Castrele Traiane, and Plenița.

The locality was a town until 1950. Its neighbors are the following communes: Verbița to the north; Orodel and Caraula to the east; Unirea to the south; and Dârvari and Oprișor (from Mehedinți County) to the west and northwest.

Notable figures
Constantin Albu
Nicolae Ciucă

References

Communes in Dolj County
Localities in Oltenia